Hajji Mohammad Hossein Isfahani (born 1758, Isfahan - died 1823) was an architect and political leader in Isfahan, Persia under the rule of Qajar Persian emperor Fath Ali Shah.

Biography
In 1795 or 1796 he was named governor (beglarbegi) of Isfahan, Qom, and Kashan. In this role, Mohammad Hossein invested heavily in agriculture, which increased his own wealth and contributed to Isfahan's economic revival. In 1806 he was appointed mostowfi ol-mamalek, given the title Amin ol-Dowleh, and his son, Abd ol-Hossein Khan Isfahani succeeded him as beglarbegi. In 1809, Mohammad Hossein presented the Peacock Throne to the shah at the shah's marriage to Tarvus Khanum Taj ol-Dowleh. In 1813 he was given the title Nizam al-Dawla. In 1818, Mirza Shafi Mazandarani died and Mohammad Hossein was appointed to the position of sadr-e a'zam which he held until his death in 1823.

  
Mohammad Hossein was close to Scottish diplomat John Macdonald Kinneir, whose reports play an important role in our understanding of Mohammad Hossein's career and building. Mohammad Hossein's term as governor led to the most extensive renovating and building in Qajar times. He renovated Masjid-e Jami, and Madrasa-e Abdallah. He built three madrasas, including Sadr school, built a new palace, renovating many bazaars, restoring and expanding the canal system, and enclosing slums. He removed the famous clock on the Naqsh-e Jahan, rebuilt parts of the Safavid Haft Dast palace and renovated the Bagh-e Anguristan, the Hasht Behesht, and the Talar-e Tavila. He also built a new avenue through the Khaju quarter, Chahar Bagh-e Chinarsu (aka Bagh e Now and Bagh-e Sadri). He also constructed the royal garden, Imarat-e Sadr (aka Imarat-i Naw). Mohammad Hossein was not universally praised, Rustam al-Hukama considered him an "uneducated parvenu" and claimed that Mohammad Hossein and his brothers had stolen the possessions and royal insignia of Jafar Khan Zand when Zand fled to Shiraz in 1785.

Mohammad Hossein's son, Mohammad Ibrahim Khan Nazir ol-Dowleh, married one of the Fath Ali Shah Qajar's daughters (Khadijeh Soltan Begom, "Esmat-ed-Dowleh)  and Khan's daughter married Husayn Ali Mirza Farmanfarma, governor of Shiraz. Khan died October 19, 1823.

See also
 Abdollah Khan Amin ol-Dowleh

References

Sources
Afnan, Mirza Habibu'llah, ed. The Genesis of the Bâabâi-Bahâaâi Faiths in Shâirâaz and Fâars. Vol. 122. Brill, 2008.
Ansari, Passim, and Abd al-Husayn Sipanta, Tarikhshan-i awqaf-i Isfahan (Isfahan, 1364/1967), 4
Lambton, Ann SK. Landlord and peasant in Persia: a study of land tenure and land revenue administration. IB Tauris, 1991.

19th-century Iranian politicians
1758 births
1823 deaths
Qajar governors of Isfahan
Mostowfi ol-Mamaleks (title)
19th-century Iranian architects
18th-century Iranian politicians